American singer Tinashe has released five studio albums, four mixtapes, one extended play and thirteen singles, including seventeen as featured artist. Tinashe's debut album, Aquarius, was released on October 7, 2014. It debuted in the top 20 on the Billboard 200, and peaked within the top ten of the US, UK and Australian urban albums charts. Aquarius was supported by three singles. The lead single from the album was titled "2 On", and featured rapper ScHoolboy Q. "2 On" peaked at 24 on the Billboard Hot 100, and topped the US rhythmic chart. "2 On" also reached the top 30 in Australia, and entered the charts in Canada, France and the UK. "2 On" was later certified platinum in the US by the RIAA and in Australia by the ARIA.

The second single from Aquarius was titled "Pretend", which featured rapper ASAP Rocky. "Pretend" failed to enter the Billboard Hot 100, but appeared at number 36 on the UK R&B Singles Chart. The third single from Tinashe's debut album was "All Hands on Deck", which featured an appearance from Australian rapper Iggy Azalea in a remixed version of the song. In September 2015, Tinashe announced the tentative title of second album, Joyride. Following delays of the album's release, Tinashe released the digital album Nightride in 2016. On January 18, 2018, Tinashe released the lead single from Joyride, titled "No Drama" featuring Offset. Two more singles, "Faded Love" featuring Future and "Me So Bad" featuring Ty Dolla Sign and French Montana preceded the album. Joyride was released on April 13, 2018. On November 21, 2019, Songs for You was released as Tinashe's first independent album and fourth album overall. Tinashe's fifth studio album, 333, was released on August 6, 2021. The album was preceded by the singles, "Pasadena" featuring Buddy and "Bouncin".

Studio albums

EPs

Mixtapes

Singles

As lead artist

As featured artist

Promotional singles

Other charted songs

Guest appearances

Songwriting credits

Music videos

As lead artist

As featured artist

Cameo appearances

Notes

References 

Tinashe